Lordstown Motors Corporation (LMC) is an American electric vehicle automaker located in Lordstown, Ohio. The company is based at the Lordstown Assembly plant, which previously belonged to General Motors.

History 

Lordstown Motors was founded in 2018 by Steve Burns, former CEO of Workhorse Group. On November 7, 2019, Lordstown Motors became the owner of the former GM Lordstown plant, after signing a sales agreement with automaker General Motors in May 2019. GM loaned Lordstown Motors  in order to underwrite a substantial part of the plant purchase.

In March 2020, Lordstown Motors paid Workhorse Group US$12 million dollars for the licensing rights to the intellectual property of the Workhorse W-15 pickup truck, with the intention of developing its own electric pickup truck based upon Workhorse's preexisting design. As part of the business deal, Workhorse Group was given a 10% equity stake in Lordstown Motors.

In October 23, 2020, Lordstown reverse merged with a special-purpose acquisition company (SPAC) named DiamondPeak Holdings and became listed on the NASDAQ stock exchange. The merger gave Lordstown Motors an estimated equity value of US$1.6 billion. On the same day, GM released Lordstown Motors from its mortgage obligations related to the purchase of the Lordstown factory.

In January 2021, the company announced the opening of a vehicle service center in Irvine, California to support customers in the Southern California region. It is Lordstown's first service center outside of Ohio, with California chosen due to "the favorable regulatory backdrop in the state, which is aggressively promoting more widespread adoption of electric vehicles", according to the company.

In March 2021, the investment research firm Hindenburg Research, which specializes in short-selling, published a lengthy report about Lordstown. In the report, Hindenburg presented evidence that demonstrated a history of fraud at Lordstown, with the company misleading investors by exaggerating demand and orders for its trucks, as well as Lordstown's ability to build these trucks. Hindenburg's report showed that thousands of Lordstown's claimed orders were non-binding, no-deposit indications of interest by companies without the apparent financial strength to support the size of the orders. The report also claimed significant production delays beyond Lordstown's claimed timeline with trucks three to four years away from production, stock sales by insiders amidst vehicle testing problems, and irregularities in the background of Lordstown's founder, Steve Burns. Lordstown's stock dropped 17% on the day of the news. The company responded with a statement saying, “We will be sharing a full and thorough statement in the coming days, and when we do we will absolutely be refuting the Hindenburg Research report.” The Hindenburg Research report led to the US Securities and Exchange Commission (SEC) requesting information from Lordstown Motors regarding the short-seller's claims of misleading investors.

It was also revealed in March 2021 that one of Lordstown's prototypes caught on fire, with the company claiming the fire was caused by "human error" and that the issue had been solved by Lordstown now automating the manufacturing of its vehicles.

On June 8, 2021, Lordstown Motors amended its annual report with the SEC and said that the company did not have enough money to begin commercial production of its vehicle, and that Lordstown Motors was at risk of bankruptcy. Subsequently, both CEO Steve Burns and CFO Julio Rodriguez resigned from their positions on June 14. While the official press release stated that the resignations were in anticipation of changing from research and development to production, the non-binding nature of pre-sale agreements was brought into question after revelations that the largest three purchasers were not committed to acquiring Lordstown production vehicles, and most did not have the means to do so. An independent investigation commissioned by the board found that the pre-order agreements were overstated in number and in seriousness in order to generate press.

In August 2021, veteran automobile executive Daniel Ninivaggi, former CEO of Icahn Enterprises, was named as the new CEO.

In October 2021, Lordstown Motors announced a US$230 million deal to sell the former GM plant to Foxconn Technology Group, which would become a contract assembler for the company's Endurance pickup truck. It was announced that Foxconn would also invest US$50 million in the company through a purchase of common stock.

The Foxconn deal was finalized in May 2022, and Foxconn and Lordstown Motors created a new joint-venture, MIH EV Design LLC, to develop and produce a line of EV vehicles. In addition to selling the factory to Foxconn, Foxconn was to become the contract manufacturer for Lordstown Motors’ first vehicle, the all-electric Endurance pickup truck. Foxconn will also use the factory as the production hub for the proposed Fisker PEAR electric vehicle.

Although at one time, GM had invested US$75 million in Lordstown Motors, and obtained a seat on Lordstown Motors' board of directors, and listed Lordstown Motors in its Tier 1 supply chain, in March 2022, GM released public information that they had sold off their "small investment" in Lordstown Motors at the end of 2021.

In July 2022, automotive industry veteran Edward Hightower was named the new CEO. In November 2022, Foxconn invested another US$170 million in Lordstown, in an effort to ramp up the production of the company's debut model.

Vehicles 

The Lordstown Endurance is an in-production all-wheel-drive (AWD), electric pickup truck. Its design includes independent wheel hub motors on all four wheels. The AWD hub motor system aims to reduce the amount of moving parts by eschewing wheel axles and transmissions. In November 2020, the release date was delayed, pushing the first deliveries back to September 2021, with production ramping up through 2022.

By October 2021, the announced production date for the Endurance had been delayed until no earlier than April 2022, following the September news that the Lordstown auto plant would be sold to Foxconn and that Foxconn would become the contract manufacturer of the Endurance.

In October 2021, Foxconn unveiled three new prototype vehicles: the Model C SUV scheduled to go on sale in 2023 in Taiwan, an electric bus that was planned to be tested in select cities in 2022, and a new electric sedan.

On August 4, 2022, the company admitted to further production delays for the Endurance, citing they would need to raise "substantially more capital" to produce the initial goal of 500 vehicles.

Lordstown Motors launched production of its Endurance pickup truck in the third quarter of 2022. In February 2023, the company issued a recall and halted production of the vehicle to address an electrical-connection issue that could lead to a loss of propulsion while driving.

See also 
Lordstown Assembly
Workhorse Group

References

External links 

American companies established in 2019
Companies listed on the Nasdaq
Electric vehicle manufacturers of the United States
Motor vehicle manufacturers based in Ohio
Vehicle manufacturing companies established in 2019
Battery electric vehicle manufacturers
Special-purpose acquisition companies